Squalene methyltransferase (TMT-1, TMT-2) is an enzyme with systematic name S-adenosyl-L-methionine:squalene C-methyltransferase. This enzyme catalyses the following chemical reaction

 2 S-adenosyl-L-methionine + squalene  2 S-adenosyl-L-homocysteine + 3,22-dimethyl-1,2,23,24-tetradehydro-2,3,22,23-tetrahydrosqualene (overall reaction)
(1a) S-adenosyl-L-methionine + squalene  S-adenosyl-L-homocysteine + 3-methyl-1,2-didehydro-2,3-dihydrosqualene
(1b) S-adenosyl-L-methionine + 3-methyl-1,2-didehydro-2,3-dihydrosqualene  S-adenosyl-L-homocysteine + 3,22-dimethyl-1,2,23,24-tetradehydro-2,3,22,23-tetrahydrosqualene

There are two isoforms in the green alga Botryococcus braunii BOT22 that differ in their specificity .

References

External links 
 

EC 2.1.1